The  was a constituency that represents Tottori Prefecture in the House of Councillors in the Diet of Japan. Councillors are elected to the house by single non-transferable vote (SNTV) for six-year terms. Since the establishment of the current House of Councillors electoral system in 1947, the district has elected two Councillors, one each at elections held every three years. With its 474,963 registered voters (as of September 2015) it is the smallest electoral district for the house. Accordingly, a 2015 revision of the Public Officers Election Law will see the district merged with the Shimane At-large district to create the Tottori-Shimane At-large district; this change took effect at the 2016 election, at which one Councillor was elected.

The Councillors currently representing Tottori are:
 Kazuyuki Hamada (Party for Japanese Kokoro; term ends in 2016)
 Shoji Maitachi (Liberal Democratic Party; term ends in 2019)

Elected Councillors

Election results

References 

Districts of the House of Councillors (Japan)